The Cajamarca gecko (Gonatodes atricucullaris) is a species of lizard in the Sphaerodactylidae family found in Peru.

References

Gonatodes
Reptiles described in 1921